An environmental organization is an organization coming out of the conservation or environmental movements
that seeks to protect, analyse or monitor the environment against misuse or degradation from human forces.

In this sense the environment may refer to the biophysical environment or the natural environment. The organization may be a charity, a trust, a non-governmental organization, a governmental organization or an intergovernmental organization. Environmental organizations can be global, national, regional or local. Some environmental issues that environmental organizations focus on include pollution, plastic pollution, waste, resource depletion, human overpopulation and climate differences.

Intergovernmental organizations

Global organizations
 Global Alliance on Health and Pollution (GAHP)
 Earth System Governance Project (ESGP)
 School strike for climate or Fridays for Future (FFF)
 Global Green Growth Institute (GGGI) 
 Intergovernmental Panel on Climate Change (IPCC)
 International Union for Conservation of Nature (IUCN)
 United Nations Environment Programme (UNEP)
 European Environment Agency (EEA) 
 Partnerships in Environmental Management for the Seas of East Asia (PEMSEA)

Governmental agencies 

Many states have agencies devoted to monitoring and protecting the environment:

Netherlands
 Ministry of Agriculture, Nature and Food Quality
 Ministry of Economic Affairs and Climate Policy
 Ministry of Health, Welfare and Sport
 Ministry of Infrastructure and Water Management
 Staatsbosbeheer

New Zealand
 Parliamentary Commissioner for the Environment

Nigeria
 Kano State Environmental Planning and Protection Agency

Saudi Arabia
 Saudi Environmental Society

South Africa
 CapeNature
 Eastern Cape Parks
 Ezemvelo KZN Wildlife
 Limpopo Tourism and Parks Board
 Mpumalanga Parks Board
 North West Parks and Tourism Board
 South African National Parks

Switzerland
 Federal Office for the Environment

United States

 Environmental Protection Agency
 Fish and Wildlife Service
 National Park Service
 Inter-Tribal Environmental Council

International non-governmental organizations 
These organizations are involved in environmental management, lobbying, advocacy, and/or conservation efforts:

International
 350.org
 African Conservation Foundation
 African Wildlife Foundation
 A Rocha
 Anti-nuclear movement
 Arab Forum for Environment and Development
 Biofuelwatch
 American Forests
 Bioversity International
 BirdLife International
 CEE Bankwatch Network
 Center for Development and Strategy
 Citizens' Climate Lobby
 Climate Action Network
 Confederation of European Environmental Engineering Societies
 Conservation International
 Dancing Star Foundation
 Deep Green Resistance
 Earth Charter Initiative
 EARTHDAY.ORG
 Earthwatch
 Environmental Defense Fund
 Fauna and Flora International
 Fondation Pacifique
 Foundation for Environmental Education
 Forest Stewardship Council
 Forests and the European Union Resource Network 
 Frankfurt Zoological Society
 Friends of Nature
 Friends of the Earth
 Global Footprint Network
 Global Landscapes Forum
 Global Witness
 GoodPlanet Foundation
  Great Transition Initiative
 Green Actors of West Africa
 Green Africa Youth Organization (GAYO) 
 Green Cross International
 Greenpeace
 Green Belt Movement
 IDEAS For Us
 Interamerican Association for Environmental Defense
 International Analog Forestry Network
 International Institute for Environment and Development
 International Rivers
 International Tree Foundation
 International Union for Conservation of Nature 
 Let's Do It! World
 Marine Stewardship Council
 Miss Earth
 Mountain Wilderness
 NatureServe
 Oceana
 Panthera Corporation
 Partners in Population and Development
 Plant A Tree Today Foundation 
 Pragya
 Programme for the Endorsement of Forest Certification
 Project AWARE
 Rainforest Action Network
 Rainforest Alliance
 Rainforest Foundation Fund
 Rainforest Foundation UK
 Rainforest Foundation US
 Rainforest Trust
 Rewilding Europe
 Sandwatch
 Sea Shepherd
 Seeds of Survival 
 Society for the Environment 
 Surfrider Foundation 
 The Climate Reality Project
 The Mountain Institute
 The Nature Conservancy
 This is My Earth 
 Traffic (conservation programme)
 Tree Aid
 Wetlands International
 WILD Foundation
 Wildlife Conservation Society
 World Business Council for Sustainable Development
 World Land Trust 
 World Resources Institute 
 World Union for Protection of Life
 World Wide Fund for Nature
 Worldwatch Institute
 Xerces Society
 Yellowstone to Yukon Conservation Initiative
 Young Friends of the Earth
 Zoological Society of London

Continental

Africa
 Environmental Foundation for Africa
 Women Environment Programme

Europe
 Bioenergy Europe
 ClientEarth
 Climate Action Network – Europe (CAN-Europe)
 Coastwatch Europe
 European Environmental Bureau
 European Wildlife

North America
 Aytzim: Ecological Judaism
 Fund for Wild Nature
 International Joint Commission
 National Cleanup Day
 North American Native Fishes Association
 Rivers Without Borders
 Sierra Club
 Stand.earth

East Asia
 Greenpeace East Asia
 Global Green Growth Institute

Southeast Asia
 Rainforest Foundation Norway
 Green Life Environmental Conservation and Social Development Group
 Greenpeace Southeast Asia

National non-governmental organizations 
These organizations are involved in environmental management, lobbying, advocacy, and/or conservation efforts at the national level:

Albania 
 Institute for Environmental Policy in Albania

Australia 

 Australian Conservation Foundation
 Australian Koala Foundation
 Australian Network of Environmental Defenders Offices
 Australian Student Environment Network
 Australian Youth Climate Coalition
 Australian Wildlife Conservancy
 Blue Mountains Conservation Society
 Bush Heritage Australia
 Birds Australia
 Blue Wedges
 CERES Community Environment Park
 Clean Ocean Foundation
 Environment Victoria
 Foundation for National Parks & Wildlife
 Greening Australia
 Public Transport Users Association
 The Wilderness Society (Australia)
 Wildlife Watch Australia
 Keep Australia Beautiful

Austria 
 Transitforum Austria Tirol

Bangladesh 
 Bangladesh Environmental Lawyers Association

Belgium 
 Corporate Europe Observatory

Bolivia 
 Comunidad Inti Wara Yassi (CIWY)

Cambodia 
 Angkor Centre for Conservation of Biodiversity
 Free the Bears Fund
 Save Cambodia's Wildlife

Canada 

 Ancient Forest Alliance
 Bird Protection Quebec
 Canadian Association of Physicians for the Environment
 Canadian Environmental Law Association
 Canadian Environmental Network
 Canadian Parks and Wilderness Society
 Canadian Youth Climate Coalition
 David Suzuki Foundation
 Earth Liberation Army (ELA)
 Earth Rangers
 Ecojustice Canada
 Energy Probe
 Green Action Centre
 Manitoba Eco-Network
 Nature Canada
 Nature Conservancy of Canada
 Ontario Nature
 Pembina Institute
 Regenesis (non-profit organization)
 Sierra Club Canada
 Sierra Youth Coalition
 Stand.earth
 The Society for the Preservation of Wild Culture
 Toronto Environmental Alliance (TEA)
 Western Canada Wilderness Committee

Cape Verde 
 Quercus Cabo Verde

China 
 Friends of Nature (China)
 Green Camel Bell
 Greenpeace East Asia

Colombia 
 Fundación ProAves

Costa Rica 
 Acción de Lucha Anti-Petrola

Croatia 
 Ekološko društvo Zeleni Osijek

Czech Republic 
 Hnutí Brontosaurus
 Hnutí DUHA – Friends of the Earth Czech Republic

Denmark 
 Danish Organisation for Renewable Energy (OVE)

Estonia 
 Estonian Nature Fund
 Tartu Students' Nature Conservation Circle

Ethiopia 
 Population, health, and the environment (PHE)
 SOS Sahel Ethiopia

Finland 
 Finnish Association for Nature Conservation
 Finnish Natural Heritage Foundation

France 
 France Nature Environnement
 GoodPlanet Foundation
 Water and Rivers of Brittany

Germany 
 Bund für Umwelt und Naturschutz Deutschland
 BUNDjugend
 EarthLink e.V.
 Ethecon Foundation
 Fuck for Forest
 German Foundation for World Population
 Global Nature Fund
 Naturschutzbund Deutschland 
 Robin Wood
 The Heinz Sielmann Foundation

Greece 
 Environmental Centre ARCTUROS
 ARCHELON, the Sea Turtle Protection Society of Greece
 Mediterranean Association to Save the Sea Turtles (MEDASSET)

Hong Kong 
 Clean Air Network
 Clear the Air (Hong Kong)
 Friends of the Earth (HK)
 Green Council
 Green Power
 Greenpeace
 Lights Out Hong Kong
 Society for Protection of the Harbour
 The Conservancy Association
 The Climate Group

India 
 Agency for Non-conventional Energy and Rural Technology (ANERT)
 Bombay Natural History Society  (BNHS)
 Centre for Science and Environment (CSE)
 Conserve
 Environment Conservation Group
 Environmentalist Foundation of India
 Pasumai Thaayagam TNPT
 Poovulagin Nanbargal
 Pragya India
 The Energy and Resources Institute
 Vindhyan Ecology and Natural History Foundation

Indonesia 
 Borneo Orangutan Survival Foundation
 Fire Free Alliance
 Gili Eco Trust
 The Indonesian Forum for Environment
 Mangrove Care Forum Bali
 Organisation for the Preservation of Birds and their Habitat
 Sumatran Orangutan Conservation Programme
 Yayasan Merah Putih

Ireland 
 Gluaiseacht
 Irish Peatland Conservation Council (IPCC)
 Tramore Eco Group

Israel 
 Green Party
 Israel Union for Environmental Defense 
 Society for the Protection of Nature in Israel 
 Zalul Environmental Association

Italy 
 Rientrodolce
 Legambiente

Kenya 
 Green Belt Movement
 Pragya Kenya

Korea 
 Friends of the Earth Korea
 Global Green Growth Institute 
 Korean Federation for Environmental Movement
 Korean Mountain Preservation League

North Macedonia 
 Macedonian Ecological Society

Madagascar 
 Blue Ventures
 L'Homme et L'Environnement

Malta 
 BirdLife Malta

Nepal 
 International Centre for Integrated Mountain Development
 National Trust for Nature Conservation

Netherlands 
 Global Forest Coalition
 Milieudefensie
 Rutgers WPF
 Dutch Society for the Protection of Animals

New Zealand 
 Buller Conservation Group
 Environment and Conservation Organisations of Aotearoa New Zealand
 Live Ocean
 Native Forest Restoration Trust
 New Zealand Ecological Restoration Network
 New Zealand Institute of Environmental Health 
 OceansWatch
 Royal Forest and Bird Protection Society of New Zealand
 Save Happy Valley Campaign
 Waipoua Forest Trust

Norway 
 Bellona Foundation
 Eco-Agents
 Green Warriors of Norway 
 Nature and Youth
 Norwegian Society for the Conservation of Nature
 Zero Emission Resource Organisation

Pakistan 
 Himalayan Wildlife Foundation

Palestine 
 Palestinian Environmental NGOs Network

Philippines 
 Haribon Foundation
 Sibuyanons Against Mining
 Alyansa Tigil Mina

Poland
 Workshop for All Beings

Portugal 
 Quercus

Puerto Rico 
 Casa Pueblo

Sierra Leone 
 ENFORAC (Environmental Forum for Action)

South Africa 
 Cape Town Ecology Group
 Dolphin Action & Protection Group
 The Earth Organization
 Earthlife Africa
 Endangered Wildlife Trust
 EThekwini ECOPEACE
 Groundwork
 Koeberg Alert
 Natural Justice: Lawyers for Communities and the Environment
 Wildlife & Environment Society

Spain 
 Asociación pola defensa da ría
 Fundación Limne

Switzerland 

 Pro Natura
 Swiss Association for the Protection of Birds
 Ecology and Population
 Eaternity
 Swiss Association for Transport and Environment
 Pro Specie Rara

Tanzania 
 Tanzania Environmental Conservation Society (TECOSO Tanzania)

Uganda 
 Conservation Through Public Health (Population Health Environment programme)

Ukraine 
 Ukraine Nature Conservation Society (UkrTOP)

United Arab Emirates 
 Emirates Environmental Group
 Zayed International Foundation for the Environment

United Kingdom 
 Agroforestry Research Trust
 Association for Environment Conscious Building
 Bat Conservation Trust
 Bicycology
 BioRegional
 Botanical Society of Britain and Ireland
 British Ecological Society
 British Mycological Society
 British Phycological Society
 British Trust for Ornithology
 Buglife
 Bumblebee Conservation Trust
 Butterfly Conservation
 Campaign for Better Transport
 Campaign for National Parks (CNP)
 Campaign for the Protection of Rural Wales
 Campaign to Protect Rural England
 Canal & River Trust
 Centre for Alternative Technology (CAT)
 Chartered Institution of Water and Environmental Management (CIWEM)
 The Conservation Volunteers
 Earth Liberation Front (ELF)
 Earth Liberation Prisoner Support Network (ELPSN)
 Earthworm Society of Britain
 Environmental Investigation Agency
 Environmental Justice Foundation
 Environmental Law Foundation (ELF)
 Environmental Protection UK
 The Facilities Society (sustainable facilities)
 Forest Peoples Programme
 Friends of the Earth
 Froglife
 Garden Organic
 Global Action Plan
 Green Alliance
 Green Wood Centre
 Groundwork UK
 Hardy Plant Society
 John Muir Trust
 Keep Britain Tidy
 The Mammal Society
 Manx National Heritage
 Marine Conservation Society
 National Biodiversity Network
 National Fruit Collection
 National Trust for Places of Historic Interest or Natural Beauty
 National Trust for Scotland
 Open Spaces Society
 People & Planet
 People's Trust for Endangered Species
 Permaculture Association
 Plane Stupid
 Plantlife
 Population Matters
 Possible
 The Ramblers
 Residents Against SARP Pollution
 The Rivers Trust
 Royal Forestry Society
 Royal Horticultural Society
 RSPB (Royal Society for the Protection of Birds)
 Scottish Wildlife Trust
 Soil Association
 Stop Climate Chaos
 Sustrans
 The Tree Register
 The Civic Trust
 The Corner House
 The Institution of Environmental Sciences
 The Wildlife Trusts
 Town and Country Planning Association
 UK Environmental Law Association (UKELA)
 UK Student Climate Network (UKSCN)
 Whale and Dolphin Conservation Society
 Wildfowl & Wetlands Trust
 Woodland Trust

United States

See also 
 Environmentalism
 Environmental community organizations
 Filmography of environmentalism
 List of animal rights groups
 List of nature conservation organisations
 List of environmental ministries
 List of green parties
 List of population concern organizations
 List of renewable energy organizations
 List of environmental organisations topics
 List of international environmental agreements

References

Further reading 
 

Lists of environmental organizations
Environmental organisations
Org